Elliot Anderson (born 6 November 2002) is a Scottish professional footballer who plays for Premier League club Newcastle United as a midfielder. Born in England and of Scottish descent, Anderson has represented both countries at a youth international level.

Early life
Anderson hails from Whitley Bay, Tyne and Wear. His maternal grandfather, Geoff Allen, played as an outside-left for Newcastle United from 1964 to 1968.

Club career

Newcastle United
Anderson first joined Newcastle United at the age of eight having previously been at Wallsend Boys Club and signed his first professional contract with the club in November 2019, signing another long-term deal a year later on his eighteenth birthday. On 9 January 2021, Anderson made his first-team debut in a 2–0 defeat to Arsenal in the third round of the FA Cup. On 18 January, Anderson made his Premier League debut against the same opposition in a 3–0 defeat, as an 87th-minute substitute. 

On 17 March 2023, following a VAR assessment, Anderson had a goal disallowed against Nottingham Forest. Dermot Gallagher, described this decision as controversial.

Bristol Rovers (loan)
On 31 January 2022, Anderson joined League Two side Bristol Rovers on loan until the end of the 2021–22 season. He made his debut on 5 February, impressing off of the bench in a 1–1 draw at Sutton United. Anderson opened his account for the club, scoring the first league goal of his career, with the second in a 4–0 away win at Stevenage before assisting namesake Harry Anderson for the third four minutes later in a performance that was rated 9/10 by local media outlet Bristol Live. Following a 1–0 victory over Colchester United in which Anderson scored the only goal of the game, his third goal for the club and scoring for a second consecutive match, manager and former Newcastle midfielder Joey Barton compared Anderson's style of play to that of Diego Maradona. Anderson was awarded the League Two Goal of the Month award for March 2022 for his impressive solo run and finish against Harrogate Town, receiving 50% of the public vote. On 7 May 2022, Anderson was awarded the EFL Young Player of the Month Award for April 2022 after three goals and two assists in six matches left Rovers close to an automatic promotion spot, later winning the EFL League Two Player of the Month Award too. That same day, the final league match of the season, Anderson scored Rovers' final goal in the 85th minute of a 7–0 thrashing of Scunthorpe United, this goal moving Rovers above Northampton Town on a goals scored basis into the final automatic promotion spot, the club returning to League One at the first time of asking.

Return to Newcastle and breakthrough
On 21 September 2022, Anderson's breakthrough into the first-team was rewarded with a new long-term contract. On 26 February 2023, he came off the bench in the 91st minute of the 2023 EFL Cup final defeat to Manchester United. He was controversially denied a first Newcastle goal on 17 March 2023 when his back-post header was ruled out by VAR, a decision that was criticised by many pundits.

International career
Born in England, Anderson is of Scottish descent with a grandmother on his father's side born in Glasgow and later residing in Whitley Bay. He was a youth international for Scotland at U16, U17 & U18 level. He switched his allegiance back to England in March 2021, making his debut in a friendly against Arsenal U23s on 27 March 2021. Anderson was selected in the Scotland under-21 squad in November 2021. Anderson received a second call-up for the Scotland U21 squad in March 2022, instead opting to remain with his loan club Bristol Rovers. Anderson made his Scotland under-21 debut on 5 June as they held group leaders Belgium to a 0–0 draw.

Career statistics

Honours
Bristol Rovers
EFL League Two third-place promotion: 2021–22

Newcastle United
EFL Cup runner-up: 2022–23

Individual
EFL League Two Goal of the Month: March 2022
EFL Young Player of the Month: April 2022
EFL League Two Player of the Month: April 2022

References

External links
ScottishFA Profile

2002 births
Living people
People from Whitley Bay
Footballers from Tyne and Wear
Scottish footballers
Scotland under-21 international footballers
Scotland youth international footballers
English footballers
England youth international footballers
English people of Scottish descent
Association football midfielders
Wallsend Boys Club players
Newcastle United F.C. players
Bristol Rovers F.C. players
Premier League players
English Football League players